() is an Arabic-language term used by some Muslims to refer to the alterations that are believed to have been made to the previous revelations of God—specifically those that make up the Tawrat (or Torah), the Zabur (or Psalms) and the Injil (or Gospel). It is also used to refer to what Muslims consider to be the corrupted Jewish and Christian interpretations of the previous revelations of God, known as “Tahrif al-Mana”. This position does not hold that the previous revelations of God were altered in text.

Origin
Tahrif in meaning and not text was first characterised in the writings al-Kasim b. Ibrahim (9th century), who made the claim that the corruption was not in the text of the previous revelations, but in the interpretations of the Jews and Christians. The corruption of interpretation is referred to as "Tahrif al-mana". 
Likewise, early quranic exegete Al-Tabari also rejected tahrif of the text and referred to the Jewish Torah in his words as "the Torah that they possess today". It is worthy to note however that the companion Ibn Abbas did make some statements that imply he believed the scriptures of ‘the people of the book’ were distorted. In Sahih Bukhari he is quoted saying as narrated by Ubaidullah:
““Ibn `Abbas said, "Why do you ask the people of the scripture about anything while your Book (Qur'an) which has been revealed to Allah's Messenger (ﷺ) is newer and the latest? You read it pure, undistorted and unchanged, and Allah has told you that the people of the scripture (Jews and Christians) changed their scripture and distorted it, and wrote the scripture with their own hands and said, 'It is from Allah,' to sell it for a little gain. Does not the knowledge which has come to you prevent you from asking them about anything? No, by Allah, we have never seen any man from them asking you regarding what has been revealed to you!"”

The corruption of the Biblical text was first explicated by Ibn Hazm (11th century), who popularized the concept of "Tahrif al-nass," or corruption of the text. Ibn Hazm rejected claims of Mosaic authorship and posited that Ezra was the author of the Torah. He systematically organised the arguments against the authenticity of the Biblical text in the first (Tanakh) and second part (New Testament) of his book: chronological and geographical inaccuracies and contradictions; theological impossibilities (anthropomorphic expressions, stories of fornication and whoredom, and the attributing of sins to prophets), as well as lack of reliable transmission (tawatur) of the text. He explains how the falsification of the Torah could have taken place while there existed only one copy of the Torah kept by the Aaronic priesthood of the Temple in Jerusalem. Ibn Hazm's arguments had a major impact upon Muslim literature and scholars, and the themes that he raised with regard to tahrif and other polemical ideas were modified slightly by some later authors.

Types
Amin Ahsan Islahi writes about four types of tahrif:
 To deliberately interpret something in a manner that is opposite to the author's intention. To distort the pronunciation of a word to such an extent that the word changes completely.
 To add to or delete a sentence or discourse in a manner that distorts the original meaning. For example, according to Muslim tradition, the Jews altered the incident of the migration of Abraham in a manner that no one could prove that Abraham had any relationship with the Kaaba.
 To translate a word that has two meanings in the meaning that is against the context.
 To raise questions about something that is absolutely clear in order to create uncertainty about it, or to change it completely.

See also
 Biblical inerrancy
 Categories of New Testament manuscripts
 Criticism of the Quran
 Great and abominable church - Mormon equivalent doctrine
 Islamic holy books
 Internal consistency of the Bible
 Naskh
 Supersessionism
 Textual variants in the New Testament

Notes

External links
 Corruption in the Bible: The Muslim Stance
 Is The Bible Corrupted?
 What the Gospels Mean to Muslims

Islam and other religions
Islamic terminology
Supersessionism